Sir John Peyton (1544–1630) was an English soldier, MP and administrator, as well as the Governor of Jersey. He was born in Knowlton, Kent to John Peyton (died 1558) and Dorothy Peyton, who was the daughter of John Tyndale.

He entered Parliament in 1572 as MP for King's Lynn and was re-elected to the same seat in 1584 and 1593. He was knighted in 1586 and served under Robert Dudley. He was Lieutenant-Governor of Bergen op Zoom from 1586 to 1587 and was a colonel "in the forces for the defence of the queen's person against the threatened attack of the Spanish Armada" in 1588. He was Sheriff of Norfolk for 1588. He served as a deputy lieutenant of Cambridgeshire under Roger North in 1596 and MP for Middlesex in 1597. He was appointed lieutenant of the Tower of London from 1597 to 1603, during which time he gave kind attention to Sir Walter Raleigh when he was imprisoned. He sat in Parliament for the last time in 1601 as member for Weymouth. He later served as Governor of Jersey from 1603 to 1630; a post that was formerly held by Raleigh.

On 8 June 1578, Peyton married Dorothy Bell (died 1603), the widow of Sir Robert Bell (died 1577), co-heiress of Edward Beaupré of Beaupré Hall, Outwell, Norfolk, and his second wife, Catherine Beddingfield. Peyton gained a position in the county of Norfolk from his wife's property and the responsibilities of raising Bell's eight children, together with his only son, Sir John Peyton (1579–1635).

References

Helen M. E. Evans, "Peyton, Sir John (1544-1630)", Oxford Dictionary of National Biography, Oxford University Press, 2004, retrieved 7 May 2005

1544 births
1630 deaths
People from Dover District
English army officers
Governors of Jersey
Knights Bachelor
High Sheriffs of Norfolk
English MPs 1572–1583
English MPs 1584–1585
English MPs 1593
English MPs 1597–1598
English MPs 1601
People from Outwell